Uveal autoantigen with coiled-coil domains and ankyrin repeats is a protein that in humans is encoded by the UACA gene.

References

Further reading